Motolayataq (also, Motalayataq, Motalayatag, and Motolayyatag) is a village and municipality in the Astara Rayon of Azerbaijan. It has a population of 1,108. The municipality consists of the villages of Motalayataq, Anbabu, Vələparqo, Əkbərməhlə, and Şıxımpeştə.

References 

Populated places in Astara District